Fox Life was a television channel in Italy that was owned by Fox Networks Group Italy. The channel primarily targets women.

Two time-shifted versions of the channel, called Fox Life +1 and Fox Life +2, broadcast the same programming an hour later or two hours later. On February 1, 2012, a high-definition simulcast called Fox Life HD premiered.

On July 1, 2020, the channel closed.

Programming
The schedule contained drama series, reality shows, lifestyle magazines and documentaries. Programmes were both foreign imports and Italian productions.

Final
Programmes that are shown upon closure include:
 Castle
 Cougar Town
 Desperate Housewives
 Extreme Makeover (Dubbed in Italian)
 Hope & Faith
 In Plain Sight
 Medium
 Millionaire Matchmaker (Dubbed in Italian)
 Nanny 911
 Revenge
 Secret Diary of a Call Girl
 Sex and the City
 The Simple Life (Dubbed in Italian)
 Will & Grace

Former
Programmes that are no longer shown include:
 Accidentally on Purpose
 Bones
 Close to Home
 Cold Case
 Grey's Anatomy
 Lipstick Jungle
 Private Practice
 Samantha Who?
 Satisfaction
 The Nanny

References

External links
 

Italy
Italian-language television stations
Defunct television channels in Italy
Television channels and stations established in 2004
Television channels and stations disestablished in 2020
2004 establishments in Italy
2020 disestablishments in Italy